Clytocera is a genus of long-horned beetle in the tribe Clytini. The genus was erected in 1906 for the southern Indian species Clytocera chionospila by Charles Joseph Gahan. The genus was separated from Rhaphuma on the basis of raised and divergent antennal supports.

Species in the genus include:
 Clytocera assamensis  from Assam
 Clytocera anhea 
 Clytocera chionospila 
 Clytocera gujaratensis  (Gujarat, Karnataka)
 Clytocera luteofasciata 
 Clytocera montensis 
 Clytocera pilosa 
 Clytocera taiwanensis

References 

Cerambycidae genera
Clytini